The Four Continents Gymnastics Championships refers to two distinct competitions, organized by different federations in different disciplines. In rhythmic gymnastics the tournaments were organized from 1978 to 2001 by the International Gymnastics Federation. In aesthetic group gymnastics the tournaments have been organized by the International Federation of Aesthetic Group Gymnastics since 2014. The events gather competitors from four different continents: Africa, the Americas, Asia and Oceania.

Rhythmic gymnastics
The Four Continents Rhythmic Gymnastics Championships was a biennial rhythmic gymnastics tournament proposed to the International Gymnastics Federation (FIG) by members of the gymnastics federations of New Zealand and Canada. The purpose was to provide a corresponding event to the European Rhythmic Gymnastics Championships as a chance for rhythmic gymnasts from non-European nations to compete internationally. The first edition of the Four Continent Championships was organized in 1978 in Toronto, Canada. The last edition of the tournament was held in Curitiba, Brazil, in 2001. All of the editions of the championships were officially organized by FIG.

Editions

Individual all-around medalists

Aesthetic group gymnastics
The Four Continents Aesthetic Group Gymnastics Championships are organized and sanctioned by the International Federation of Aesthetic Group Gymnastics (IFAAG).

Editions

See also
 Asian Gymnastics Championships
 Pan American Gymnastics Championships

References

Recurring sporting events established in 1978
Recurring sporting events disestablished in 2001
Rhythmic gymnastics competitions